York School is a coeducational day school consisting of about 225 students on a hilltop near Highway 68 in Monterey, California.

History
York was founded in 1959 with 12 seventh-grade boys and two teachers.  For the first year, only seventh-grade boys were admitted, but it was planned that a grade would be added each year as the class advanced until a full high school was in session. Later, the seventh grade was dropped.
It was decided that the Episcopal school would be called York after the Diocese of York in England, one of the oldest in existence. The coat of arms of the See of York was adopted as the school's slogan and is still in use today.

York started in Pacific Grove, but was soon moved to Monterey. Out of necessity, it was a day school until dormitories could be built in 1964. The same year, the new Laguna Seca campus was opened, where York remains today. Later, for various reasons, including financial constraints, York stopped accepting boarding students. The dorms were converted into classrooms and the boarders were sent to a house in Pacific Grove, called the “pink house,” where they finished their education as the last class to include boarding students.

York would see many more changes in the ensuing years. In 1970, York became coeducational. In 1973, it became non-diocesan. The land still belongs to the Episcopal Church and will return to the Church if York dissolves. However, York is not as closely affiliated with the Church as it had been in the past. As the school grew, more electives were added to the curriculum, such as art and choral music. Originally, York had no official sports teams, but in time various teams were formed. A chapel was built in 1981 in memory of a local philanthropist and in 1983 a locomotive bell was added to the chapel.

In 2003, York built an energy-efficient green-sciences building. It includes photo-voltaic solar panels that supply power for the building, recycled materials in the building itself, sensor controlled lighting, waterless urinals, and optimized framing that reduced lumber use in the project. There was limited site disturbance during construction of the science building. Some of the materials used were recycled, including insulation and lumber. In 2007 the York became the first school to be certified by the Monterey Bay Area Green Business Program.

Sports
York has a variety of sports for both boys and girls, for varsity and junior varsity divisions. During the Fall, students may participate in Boys’ Water Polo, Girls’ Field Hockey, Girls’ Tennis, Girls’ Volleyball, or Boys’ and Girls’ Cross Country. During the Winter, they may participate in soccer or basketball, which are divided into girl and boy teams. In Spring, students may join boys’ and girls’ lacrosse, track and field, and swimming, or Boys’ Tennis (coached by stellar Chamisal coach Matt(hew) Ledoux), Girls’ Softball, and coed golf. The school's colors are red and black, and its mascot is the Falcon.

Classes and schedule

York offers a rigorous academic curriculum, a competitive athletic program, opportunities for individual and group participation in the arts, and a healthy variety of extracurricular activities and clubs. York's core curriculum, as determined by the school's graduation requirements, reflects a traditional liberal arts paradigm with an emphasis on math, history, English, foreign languages, and science. The students must also fulfill a fine arts and performing arts requirement. Modern languages studied include Spanish, Chinese, and French (German was formerly offered, but has since been phased out). Latin and Ancient Greek are not offered because the school only teaches Latin. A variety of elective courses, including Asian History, Psychology, Cinema, American Government, and Economics, supplement the core curriculum. There is probably an average of 13 students per class, and the student-faculty ratio is 9:1.

York employs a unique eight-day rotating schedule of A through H days that allows students to take a maximum of seven classes. There are only five periods each day though, as each class only meets five times during the eight-day rotation. Additionally, the order of the classes rotates such that no class meets at the same time of the day during a given cycle.

Headmasters
 Father Brunner (1959–1965)
 Father Wood (1965–1966)
 Charles S. Downes (1966–1974)
 John H. Pomeroy (1974–1976)
 Henry Littlefield (1977–1990)
 Dr. Richard Enemark (1991–1993)
 Jim Tunney (1994–1995)
 Roger Bowen (1995–2002)
 Chuck Harmon (2002–2019)
 Doug Key (2019–present)

Noted alumni
 Ben Jealous, former president of NAACP and executive director of environmental advocacy group Sierra Club
 Scott Snibbe, media artist and founder of Snibbe Interactive
 Greg Rucka, novelist and comic book writer

Financial aid
Through an ambitious financial aid program that awards grants and loans to approximately 42 percent of its students' families, the school is able to enroll excellent students from across a spectrum of economic diversity.

Recognition
In 1991, York was one of 222 public and private schools nationwide to be recognized by the U.S. Department of Education as a Blue Ribbon School of Excellence. Over the past six years, approximately 43 percent of York's seniors have been honored by the National Merit Corporation as finalists, winners, or commended students. One hundred percent of York's graduates go to college, with a majority attending University of California campuses, top liberal arts colleges, or Ivy League schools.

Footnotes and sources

External links
York School

High schools in Monterey County, California
Educational institutions established in 1959
Private high schools in California
Private middle schools in California
Buildings and structures in Monterey, California
1959 establishments in California